Iain Maclean (born 1965) is a Scottish basketball coach. He was the head coach of the Scotland men's national team and the Glasgow Storm club. He is also known for his time as a player for teams in both Scotland and Great Britain.
Maclean is also head coach of the Scotland Men's Universities basketball team which won the BUSA Home Nations Basketball title in April 2007.
Maclean played NCAA Division I college basketball at Northern Arizona University and played professionally with the former MIM Livingston team and the Scottish Rocks in the British Basketball League. He also coached the Scottish Rocks during the 2001–02 season after Greg Lockridge was fired.

Career history
2001–02  St Mirren (player/coach)
1998–2001  Scottish Rocks
1987–98  Midlothian/Livingston Bulls
1984–86  Paisley

Trivia
Scottish Rocks retired the number 13 jersey in honour of Maclean.

See also
Scottish Rocks

External links
 Fact File: Iain Maclean
 Maclean named Head Coach of Scotland Senior Men
 MacLean names first squad 
 Scotland take BUSA Home Nations Basketball title

Living people
1965 births
Glasgow Rocks players
Scottish men's basketball players
Scottish basketball coaches